Skalité is a village and municipality in Čadca District in the Žilina Region of northern Slovakia.

History
In historical records the village was first mentioned in 1662. In late October 1938, Skalite, together with adjacent villages, was occupied by the Polish Army. In response, units of the Czechoslovak Border Guard opened fire on the Polish units, and a skirmish took place, with some victims. On November 1, 1938, Poland and Czechoslovakia signed a treaty, after which a commission was created to establish a new borderline. On November 30 in Zakopane, both sides agreed that Skalité would be annexed by the Second Polish Republic. As a result, the town became a border station of the Polish State Railways, along the strategic line from Zwardoń to Čadca. In the period fall 1938 - September 1939, Polish trains ran along the Zwardoń - Čadca - Mosty Slaskie line, without stopping at Čadca railway station, which remained part of Czechoslovakia (later Slovakia). In September 1939, following Polish September Campaign, Skalité was re-annexed by Slovakia.

Geography
The municipality lies at an altitude of 524 metres and covers an area of 33.163 km². It has a population of 5,265 people.

References

External links
 http://www.skalite.sk

Villages and municipalities in Čadca District